Papyrus is a widely available typeface designed by Chris Costello, a graphic designer, illustrator, and web designer. Created in 1982 and released by Linotype, it has a number of distinctive characteristics, including rough edges, irregular curves, and high horizontal strokes in the capitals.

History and overview
Costello created the font in 1982, when he was 23 years old and just out of college. He had been studying the Bible and came onto the idea of what a written font would have looked like in biblical times in the Middle East. He hand-drew the font over a period of six months by means of calligraphy pen and textured paper. Costello described his goal as a font that would represent what English language texts would have looked like if written on papyrus 2000 years ago. Costello released the font the following year alongside Letraset. Papyrus has a number of distinctive characteristics, including rough edges, irregular curves, and high horizontal strokes in the capitals. ITC, the current owner of the typeface, describes it as an "unusual roman typeface [that] effectively merges the elegance of a traditional roman letterform with the hand-crafted look of highly skilled calligraphy". Costello sold the rights for the font for $750, and as of 2017, states he still receives "very low" royalty payments despite its inclusion since 2000 on all personal computers using a Mac or Microsoft operating system. In any case, Costello claims "it was not my intent (for it) to be used for everything. It's way overused."

Variants

An alternative font published by Elsner+Flake is Papyrus EF Alternatives (or Papyrus EF Regular), providing a slight variation to Costello's font. Its differences include a shorter, sharper capital P, a capital E with a top bar longer than the middle bar, and a swash A.

Availability 
Papyrus has been included in many Microsoft programs for Windows. macOS includes Papyrus font as part of its basic installation (starting with version 10.3 Panther, released in 2003).

Reception and use in popular culture

Over the years, Papyrus has gained infamy for its omnipresence in graphic design, usually in situations for which it was not intended. The criticism towards the typeface is very similar to that of Comic Sans. In 2008, a website named "Papyrus Watch" was created for documenting the font's ubiquity and misusage. 

Papyrus has been used in numerous TV show opening credits such as Medium (2005–2011) and Eureka! (2006–2012).

In James Cameron's movie Avatar, the typeface is used in the title and subtitles. Its use in the film was highlighted in a Saturday Night Live sketch featuring Ryan Gosling, which also mentioned that the font is widely used for Shakira merchandise, hookah bars, and off-brand tea companies. Jon Landau, the producer of both Avatar films, claims that the sketch helped to keep Avatar relevant during production of the second film. In preparation for the expansion of the Avatar franchise, Avatar: The Way of Water saw the film series change to a proprietary font called Toruk; however, Papyrus is still used for subtitles.

Papyrus is the name of a character in Toby Fox's game Undertale. His dialogue is presented in uppercase Papyrus font.

References

External links
 Chris Costello's official site 

Display typefaces
Typefaces and fonts introduced in 1983